The New Caledonian Football Federation is the governing body of football in New Caledonia.

References

External links
 Official website 
 New Caledonia at the FIFA official website 
 New Caledonia at OFC official website 

New Caledonia
Football in New Caledonia
Football governing bodies in Overseas France
Sports organizations established in 1928